USS Galaxy (IX-54), was a diesel motor yacht built in 1930 by Pusey and Jones Company, in Wilmington, Delaware for Mr. Bernard W. Doyle, of Leominster, Massachusetts. Purchased by the United States Navy on 8 September 1941 and commissioned at East Boston, Massachusetts, on 20 September 1941. The Galaxy was the only ship of the Navy to hold this name.

Service history
Galaxy was acquired for the express purpose of research in underwater sound.  Based at East Boston throughout her entire career, as a unit of the 1st Naval District, she completed a variety of assignments for the Underwater Sound Laboratory, Fort Trumbull, New London, Connecticut; experimental underwater sound work for the Bureau of Ships and the Harvard Underwater Sound Laboratory.  These operations were carried out at Boston and off New London; and for a brief time off the Delaware breakwaters and in the Chesapeake Bay.

She was decommissioned and was placed "in service" on 2 August 1945, to continue her experimental assignments until placed out of service at Boston on 25 March 1946. Her name was struck from the Navy List on 1 May 1946 and she was transferred to the Maritime Commission on 20 May 1946 for disposal.

Awards
American Defense Service Medal
American Campaign Medal
World War II Victory Medal

References

External links  
 

1930 ships
Research vessels of the United States Navy
Ships built by Pusey and Jones